Mount Beppo is a rural locality in the Somerset Region, Queensland, Australia.

Geography 
The Brisbane River forms the north-eastern boundary.

The Brisbane Valley Highway passes to the west.

History 

The district takes its name from the neighbouring mountain, whose name in turn is believed to be derived from the Yuggera word  meaning mountain. However, as Yuggera is not a local indigenous language, it may have been Europeans who introduced the name.

The district was first settled in the early 1880s; the Granzein and Soden families were among the early pioneers.

Mount Beppo State School opened on 4 September 1893. The chairman of the school was Henry Plantagenet Somerset. In 1929 the school had about 80 pupils. The school closed on 31 December 1972. It was at 13 German Reserve Road.

By 1929, there were two churches at Mount Beppo, the Lutheran church and the Apostolic church, both with associated cemeteries.

The Lutheran Church was opened on 12 August 1888. It was extended and re-dedicated in 1930.

The first Apostolic Church services were held in 1883 in the home of Mr Carl Casper Meier and the church building was constructed about 1889, but in 1911 the building was relocated higher up the hill and extended. Further extensions occurred at part of the golden jubilee celebrations in 1934. In 2014, only the Apostolic Church remains, but both cemeteries still exist.

The town was known for its brass band, which was established in 1898 and celebrated its golden jubilee in 1949.

Caboonbah Undenominational Church is a union church. It was established by Henry Plantagenet Somerset and takes its name, "Caboonbah", from the Somerset family homestead, Caboonbah Homestead, nearby. The wooden structure was designed by Somerset's wife Katherine Rose Somerset, the daughter of David Cannon McConnell and Mary McConnel (nee McLeod) who founded the Cressbrook Homestead. The church was built by Lars Andersen. It opened in 1905 to serve the local farming community. It is located on Cressbrook-Caboonbah Road.

A public hall was opened at Mount Beppo on 15 March 1930 by Henry Plantagenet Somerset, former Member of the Legislative Assembly for the district, with the then current Member, Ernest Grimstone, in attendance.

In the 2011 census, the population of Mount Beppo was 347 people.

Education
There are no schools in Mount Beppo. The nearest primary school is Toogoolawah State School in neighbouring Toogoolawah to the north-west. The nearest secondary school is Toogoolawah State High School also in Toogoolawah.

References

Further reading

  — also includes Mount Beppo State School, Ivorys Creek Provisional School, Cross Roads Provisional School, Ottaba Provisional School, Murrumba State School, Mount Esk Pocket School, Kipper Provisional School, Lower Cressbrook School, Fulham School, Sandy Gully State School, Cooeeimbardi State School, Scrub Creek State School

External links

 Mount Beppo Apostolic cemetery
 Mount Beppo Trinity Lutheran cemetery

Suburbs of Somerset Region
Localities in Queensland